Tuanigamanuolepola Tagovailoa (born March 2, 1998) is an American football quarterback for the Miami Dolphins of the National Football League (NFL). He played college football at Alabama, where he was the Offensive MVP of the 2018 College Football Playoff National Championship during his freshman season and won the Maxwell and Walter Camp Awards as a sophomore.

After his junior season was cut short by a hip injury, Tagovailoa was selected fifth overall by the Dolphins in the 2020 NFL Draft. He spent his rookie season alternating as a backup and starter before becoming the team's primary starter in 2021.

Early life and high school career
Tagovailoa was born in ʻEwa Beach, Hawaii, to Galu and Diane Tagovailoa, as the oldest of four children in a Samoan family. He was said to have grown up with an intense interest in football, with his parents noting that he would sleep with a football under his arm every night as a small child. During Pop Warner games when he was eight years old, when his peers could typically throw a football little more than 10 yards, he routinely threw passes of more than 30 yards.

As a child, his main inspiration was his grandfather Seu Tagovailoa. He was highly respected in the local Samoan community and was regularly addressed as "Chief Tagovailoa". Seu believed that Tagovailoa would eventually grow into a football star and he requested that he visit him after every game to report his progress. Tagovailoa briefly considered quitting the sport after Seu's death in 2014 until he and his father agreed that he could best honor him by continuing to play.

When Tagovailoa began varsity football in high school, he threw for 33 passing touchdowns during his first season with three interceptions and 2,583 passing yards. Tagovailoa said a big inspiration and motivation for his performance was how his father disciplined him, saying he used a belt whenever Tagovailoa threw an interception. In 2016, Tagovailoa played in the All-American Bowl, and in his regular season threw for 2,669 passing yards with 27 passing touchdowns and seven interceptions. He was also chosen to be a part of the Elite 11 roster as one of the top high school quarterbacks in the nation, where he was named MVP of that roster.

Tagovailoa was deemed a four-star recruit during the 2017 recruiting cycle and was ranked the top high school prospect in the state of Hawaii. He attended Saint Louis School in Honolulu, the same school as 2014 Heisman Trophy winner and Atlanta Falcons quarterback Marcus Mariota, where Mariota served as a mentor to him when they were growing up in Hawaii. He had 17 offers to play on a college football scholarship before eventually enrolling at the University of Alabama in January 2017.

College career

2017 season
As a true freshman, Tagovailoa was the backup to sophomore quarterback Jalen Hurts throughout the 2017 season. However, he experienced significant playing time due to a couple of blowout victories for the Crimson Tide. On September 9, he made his collegiate debut against Fresno State in a home game at Bryant–Denny Stadium. In the 41–10 victory, he finished 6-of-9 for 64 yards and his first career passing touchdown, which was a 16-yard pass to wide receiver Henry Ruggs III. On September 23, in a 59–0 victory against Vanderbilt, he got more playing time and recorded 103 passing yards and two passing touchdowns. In the next game, against SEC West rival Ole Miss, he recorded his first collegiate rushing touchdown in a 66–3 victory. In the annual rivalry game against Tennessee, he finished with 134 passing yards, one passing touchdown, one interception, and one rushing touchdown in the 45–7 victory. On November 18, in a game against Mercer, he threw for three passing touchdowns in the 56–0 victory. On January 8, 2018, he replaced Hurts in the second half of the 2018 College Football Playoff National Championship due to ineffective play by Hurts. He threw the game-winning 41-yard touchdown pass in overtime to another true freshman, wide receiver DeVonta Smith as the Crimson Tide defeated the Georgia Bulldogs; 26–23 claiming their 17th National Championship. He finished the game 14-of-24 for 166 passing yards, three passing touchdowns and one interception, along with 27 rushing yards on 12 attempts. Tagovailoa was named the Offensive MVP of the game.

2018 season

On September 1, 2018, Tagovailoa made his first career start at the season's opening game, against Louisville, in Orlando, Florida. He finished 12-of-16, with 227 passing yards and two touchdowns in the 51–14 victory, before Jalen Hurts replaced him in the third quarter. During Alabama head coach Nick Saban's weekly Monday press conference following the victory, he announced Tagovailoa as the starter for The Crimson Tide's home opener against Arkansas State on September 8. In the 62–7 victory over Ole Miss, he was 11-of-15 for 191 passing yards and two touchdowns to go along with 47 rushing yards. He continued his efficient season against Texas A&M with 387 passing yards, four passing touchdowns, and a rushing touchdown in the 45–23 victory. In a limited role against Louisiana, he was 8-of-8 passing for 128 passing yards and two passing touchdowns in the 56–14 victory. In the next game against Arkansas, he had more passing touchdowns than incompletions as he went 10-of-13 for 334 passing yards and four passing touchdowns in the 65–31 victory. Following the regular season, he finished second in the Heisman Trophy voting to Oklahoma quarterback Kyler Murray, but he won the Walter Camp Award and Maxwell Award for 2018, both awarded to the top player in college football. While recovering from the high ankle sprain he suffered during the SEC Championship against Georgia, Tagovailoa put on a nearly flawless offensive performance against Oklahoma in the 2018 Orange Bowl (24-of-27 with 318 yards passing, four touchdowns and no interceptions) to lead the Tide to their fourth consecutive CFP National Championship appearance. He was also named Offensive MVP of that game. In the 2019 National Championship loss (44–16) against Clemson, Tagovailoa went 22-of-34 with 295 passing yards, two touchdowns and two interceptions. He also set a new NCAA FBS passer rating record of 199.4 for the season, surpassing the record 198.9 set by Baker Mayfield in 2017.

2019 season
Tagovailoa began his junior season at the Chick-fil-A Kickoff Game with a victory against Duke in Atlanta. He finished 26-of-31 with 336 passing yards and four touchdowns before sitting out the fourth quarter. The second game of the season was a home opener victory against New Mexico State. Tagovailoa finished that game 16-of-24 with 227 passing yards and four total touchdowns before sitting out the fourth quarter. In his third game of the season, a victory against South Carolina, Tagovailoa finished 28-of-36 with 444 passing yards and five touchdowns. In the Tide's 49–7 victory against Southern Miss, Tagovailoa finished 17-of-21 with 293 passing yards and five touchdowns. In the Tide's fifth game, a victory against Ole Miss, Tagovailoa finished 26-of-36 with 418 passing yards and seven total touchdowns. In the Tide's 47–28 victory against Texas A&M, Tagovailoa finished 21-of-34 with 293 passing yards, four touchdowns, and one interception.

Tagovailoa left the Tide's seventh game against Tennessee early in the second quarter after suffering a high ankle sprain. He underwent surgery to repair the ankle the following day, and did not play in the next game against Arkansas (a 48–7 victory led by quarterback Mac Jones). Tagovailoa returned three weeks post-surgery to play in the 46–41 loss to top-ranked LSU. Despite some struggles (a fumble and INT) in the first half of that game, Tagovailoa rebounded after halftime to finish 21-of-40 with 413 passing yards, four touchdowns, and one interception.

In the Tide's matchup against Mississippi State, Tagovailoa led the team to a 35–7 lead (14-of-18, 256 passing yards, two touchdowns) before leaving the game after a sack that saw his knee driven into the ground, causing his hip to dislocate and fracturing the posterior wall, as well as suffering a broken nose and concussion. He was carted off the field and flown to a Birmingham hospital before undergoing surgery in Houston two days later.

In January 2020, Tagovailoa announced that he would forgo his senior year and enter the 2020 NFL Draft. Tagovailoa finished his collegiate career as holder of numerous Alabama football records, as well as notable NCAA career records, including: passing yards per attempt (10.9), adjusted passing yards per attempt (12.7), passing efficiency rating (199.4), and total yards per play (9.8). He graduated with a bachelor's degree in communication studies in August 2020.

Statistics

Professional career

Tagovailoa was projected to be taken first overall in the 2020 NFL Draft until his season-ending injury led to LSU quarterback and 2019 Heisman Trophy winner Joe Burrow supplanting him as the draft's top prospect. Despite injury concerns, however, Tagovailoa was selected fifth overall by the Miami Dolphins. Tagovailoa was also the first left-handed quarterback to be drafted by an NFL team since Tim Tebow in 2010. As his college jersey number of 13 was retired by the Dolphins in honor of Dan Marino, Tagovailoa chose to wear number 1.

2020

Tagovailoa signed his four-year rookie contract, worth $30 million, on May 11, 2020. He passed his physical with the team in July 2020 to begin training camp, but was named the backup to Ryan Fitzpatrick to start the season.

Tagovailoa made his debut appearance in a Week 6 game against the New York Jets, coming in relief of Fitzpatrick in the fourth quarter of a 24–0 win where he threw two passes for nine yards. His NFL appearance was the first for a left-handed quarterback since Kellen Moore in 2015. During the team's bye week, Tagovailoa was named the starter for their Week 8 game against the Los Angeles Rams. On Tagovailoa's first career pass attempt as a starter, he was strip sacked by Aaron Donald. Later in the game, Tagovailoa recorded his first career touchdown on a pass thrown to DeVante Parker. In Week 11 against the Denver Broncos, Tagovailoa threw for 83 yards and a touchdown before being replaced by Ryan Fitzpatrick early in the fourth quarter with the Broncos leading 20–10. Tagovailoa jammed his thumb in practice prior to a Week 12 game against the Jets and missed the game. He made his return in Week 13 against the Cincinnati Bengals, where he threw for 296 yards and a touchdown during a 19–7 win. In Week 16 against the Las Vegas Raiders, Tagovailoa threw for 94 yards and a touchdown before being benched in favor of Fitzpatrick again in the fourth quarter. In Week 17 against the Buffalo Bills, needing a win for the Dolphins to qualify for the playoffs, Tagovailoa threw for a career-high 361 yards, one touchdown, and three interceptions as Miami lost 56–26. The Dolphins missed the playoffs for the fourth consecutive year, and for the 17th time in the 21 seasons since the retirement of Dan Marino.

2021

Tagovailoa led the Dolphins to a Week 1 win over the rival Patriots. During Week 2 against the Buffalo Bills, Tagovailoa suffered a rib injury early in the game, and was carted off the field on a motorized stretcher, not returning in that game. Tagovailoa was later ruled out for the Dolphins Week 3 matchup against the Las Vegas Raiders, as it was revealed that he had fractured several ribs. He was then placed on injured reserve on September 25, 2021, and would return from injury in Week 6 against the Jacksonville Jaguars in London. In his first game in nearly a month, Tagovailoa completed 33 of 47 passes for 329 yards, two touchdowns and an interception in a 23–20 loss to the Jaguars, dropping the Dolphins' record to 1–5. The Dolphins lost two additional games to the Atlanta Falcons and Buffalo Bills to drop their record to 1−7. The following week, Tagovailoa missed the Dolphins' Week 9 game against the Houston Texans, as the Dolphins won 17−9.

In their next game against the Baltimore Ravens, Tagovailoa came off the bench to energize the Dolphins, completing 8 of 13 passes for a 158 yards and a rushing touchdown, resulting in an upset 22−10 victory. Tagovailoa used the win to catapult a turnaround in his and his team's fortunes. The following week set the tone for the rest of the season, as he completed 27 of 33 passes for 273 yards, 2 touchdowns and an interception as the Dolphins beat the New York Jets 24−17. He led the team to its first 7-game winning streak since 1985. During their 20−9 victory over the New York Giants in Week 13, he became the first Dolphins quarterback since Dan Marino in 1994 to throw at least 21 completions in the first half of a game. In Week 17 against the Tennessee Titans, Tagovailoa and the Dolphins were blown out 34−3 by the Tennessee Titans. Following their loss, and with the Los Angeles Chargers defeating the Denver Broncos, the Dolphins were eliminated from playoff contention for the fifth consecutive year, and 18th time in 20 seasons. In the final game of the 2021 season, Tagovailoa led the Dolphins to their first sweep of the rival Patriots since 2000, making him 3−0 against Bill Belichick and the Patriots in his career. He finished the 2021 season with 2,653	passing yards, 16 passing touchdowns, and ten interceptions to go along with 42 carries for 128 rushing yards and three rushing touchdowns in 13 games.

2022

During the offseason previous to the 2022 season, Miami Dolphins fired head coach Brian Flores, arguing internal communication issues. A few weeks later several sources confirmed differences between Tagovailoa and Flores with rumors of heavy discussions among them. The Miami Dolphins hired Mike McDaniel as their head coach on February 6, 2022. McDaniel expressed unbridled support for Tagovailoa as his starting quarterback.

Tagovailoa began the season throwing for 270 yards and a touchdown in a 20−7 win over the New England Patriots, improving to 4−0 against Bill Belichick and the Patriots. The next week against the Baltimore Ravens, Tagovailoa threw for a career-high 469 yards, six touchdowns, and two interceptions in the 42−38 comeback win. The 21-point comeback was the first fourth-quarter comeback of 21+ points in 12 years. Prior to the game, teams were 0−711 when trailing by at least 21 points in the fourth quarter since 2011. His six-touchdown performance also tied the Dolphins franchise record, tying Hall of Famers Bob Griese and Dan Marino, and his 469 passing yards ranks fourth in franchise history. As a result of his historic performance, Tagovailoa was named AFC Offensive Player of the Week for Week 2.

During Week 3 against the Buffalo Bills, Tagovailoa briefly left the game with what the Dolphins claimed was a back injury but eventually returned to the game, finishing with 186 passing yards and a touchdown as the Dolphins won 21−19. After the game, the NFLPA suspected that the Dolphins might have violated concussion protocols by letting Tagovailoa back in the game and subsequently announced that they would launch an investigation. After being a game-time decision for Week 4 on Thursday Night Football, Tagovailoa was cleared to start against the Cincinnati Bengals. After taking a sack during the second quarter, Tagovailoa hit the ground with his left elbow, back and back of his helmet. Tagovailoa demonstrated a fencing response, and was stretchered off the field and transported to the University of Cincinnati Medical Center with head and neck injuries. He was discharged from the hospital later that night. Two days later, the neurotrauma consultant who was involved in Tagovailoa's concussion check during the Bills game was fired. Tagovailoa's suspected concussion resulted in the NFL and NFLPA revising its concussion protocol policy. Tagovailoa returned to practice on October 12, but remained in concussion protocol.

On October 15, Tagovailoa cleared concussion protocol, but remained inactive for the Dolphins Week 6 game against the Minnesota Vikings. Tagovailoa returned in Week 7 against the Pittsburgh Steelers on Sunday Night Football, where he threw for 261 yards and a touchdown in the 16–10 win. The next week against the Detroit Lions, Tagovailoa threw for 382 yards and three touchdowns while completing 80% of his passes in the 31–27 win. On December 21, despite topping the overall fan votes (306,861) for the 2023 Pro Bowl, Tagovailoa was only named as an AFC Pro Bowl first alternate. Tagovailoa would end up not participating in the Pro Bowl.

Against the Green Bay Packers on Christmas Day, Tagovailoa threw for 310 yards, and a touchdown, but threw three interceptions in the fourth quarter, including the game-losing one to Rasul Douglas in the 26–20 loss. The next day, it was announced that Tagovailoa had entered concussion protocol after he was experiencing concussion symptoms he suffered in the game. On December 28, head coach Mike McDaniel confirmed Tagovailoa suffered a concussion and was ruled out for the Dolphins Week 17 game against the New England Patriots, and then also ruled out for the season finale against the New York Jets.

Tagovailoa finished the regular season throwing for 3,548 yards, 25 touchdowns, and eight interceptions, going 8–5 in 13 games played. Tagovailoa also led the league in passer rating and passing average.

On January 9, the Dolphins clinched the AFC's final playoff berth, and their first since 2016. On January 11, Head coach Mike McDaniel said that Tagovailoa had not been cleared to return to practice since he entered concussion protocol a second time, and was ruled out for his third consecutive game.

2023
On March 20, 2023, the Dolphins picked up the fifth-year option of Tagovailoa's contract.

NFL career statistics

Personal life
Tagovailoa graduated early from Saint Louis School and moved with his family to Alabaster, Alabama, after his commitment to Alabama. Tagovailoa is a Christian. Although he is predominantly right-handed, his father trained him to throw the ball with his left hand as a child, because he wanted a left-handed son. , he is the only starting left-handed quarterback in the NFL.

His younger brother, Taulia Tagovailoa, is a college football quarterback for the Maryland Terrapins. He transferred there in 2020 after spending a year as Tagovailoa's backup at Alabama in 2019. Two of Tagovailoa's cousins also play football: Myron Tagovailoa-Amosa plays on the defensive line on the Las Vegas Raiders while Adam Amosa-Tagovailoa played on the offensive line at Navy.

Philanthropy

In February 2021, Tagovailoa announced the establishment of the Tua Foundation, a nonprofit dedicated to the support of youth initiatives, health and wellness, and other charitable causes. The foundation focuses its efforts in communities that have had the most prominent impact on Tua including Hawaii, Alabama, and Miami.

In recognition of the foundation launch, three grants of $16,667 (totaling $50,000) were awarded on February 4 to the Police Athletic League of North Miami, Big Oak Ranch in Springville, Alabama, and the Polynesian Football Hall of Fame in Honolulu.

In June 2020, Tagovailoa announced the establishment of a $300,000 scholarship endowment to benefit his high school, Saint Louis School in Honolulu, Hawaiʻi.

The Tua Foundation hosted its inaugural fundraising event in August 2021, raising $93,000 for the Tallapoosa County Girls Ranch to cover funeral expenses for the eight juveniles, ages 4–17, that were lost in a devastating car crash, and also counseling expenses to the girls of the ranch that lost loved ones.

References

External links

 

 Miami Dolphins bio
 Alabama Crimson Tide bio
 Tua Foundation website

1998 births
Living people
Alabama Crimson Tide football players
All-American college football players
American Christians
American football quarterbacks
American people of Samoan descent
American sportspeople of Samoan descent
Maxwell Award winners
Miami Dolphins players
Players of American football from Honolulu
Saint Louis School alumni